Going My Home is a 2012 Japanese television series, directed by Hirokazu Kore-eda and featuring Abe Hiroshi. The elderly father of a family collapses and lies in a coma. While waiting for him to recover, the family learns and investigates about his life, in particular his romantic affairs.

Cast 

Hiroshi Abe: as Tsuboi Ryota
Tomoko Yamaguchi: Tsuboi Sae
YOU: as Ito Takiko
Aoi Miyazaki: Shimojima Naho
Hirofumi Arai: Sanada Shun
Ken Yasuda: Ito Kenji
Bakarhythm: Kobayashi Satoru
Isao Natsuyagi: Tsuboi Eisuke
Sadao Abe: Tokunaga Taro
Kazuko Yoshiyuki: Tsuboi Toshiko
Toshiyuki Nishida: Torii Osamu
Aju Makita: Tsuboi Moe
Lily as Tsuji Tokiko
Noriko Eguchi as Tsutsumi 
Yasuhi Nakamura as Hatakenaka 
Takashi Yamanaka  as Kai

Plot 

After his father's collapse and admission to hospital in a coma in a small country town, Tsuboi Ryota (Abe Hiroshi) and his family gather around the stricken father in the hospital, travelling there regularly from Tokyo. Following their discovery of an unknown woman visiting him, the family begins their own investigation into their father's life. Ryota is a successful advertising agency executive and married to "food stylist" Sae (Yamaguchi Tomoko), who has her own cooking TV show. Their daughter has issues at school, imagining friends and causing trouble.

Ryota finds himself investigating his father's life in the tiny country town where his father collapsed. Ryota, while investigating his father, Eisuke's (Isao Natsuyagi) past, also has to deal with his own issues at the agency where he works, and with his wife and problems with his daughter.

After some investigation, Ryota discovers the mysterious woman Naho (Aoi Miyazaki) to be the daughter of the best friend of her father (the town dentist Tori, (Nishida Toshiyuki), who grew up together. The two shared the love of a girl who they grew up, the mother of Naho.

While staying at the town, Ryota and his daughter begins to find out about its odd ways, in particular, with the town's belief in the local legendary Kuna creatures. After finding a tiny hat apparently belonging to one of the creatures, Ryota becomes fascinated with them, and gets his work involved in a hunt for them.
Ryota and the townspeople finally organise an event based around hunting for the creatures, and Ryota appears to see one. Eisuke dies, and Ryota comes to terms with his problematic relationship with his father.

References

External links

2012 Japanese television series debuts
Television shows set in Nagano Prefecture